A cultivated plant may refer to:

A cultigen
A plant in cultivation